Yeh Fang-hsiung (born 1945) is a Taiwanese politician.

Yeh was elected mayor of Zhubei twice, in 1998 and 2002. He was elected to the Legislative Yuan in 2004, representing the Hsinchu County Constituency. Yeh considered running for a second legislative term during the 2008 election cycle, eventually yielding to fellow Kuomintang member Chiu Ching-chun.

References

1945 births
Living people
20th-century Taiwanese politicians
Members of the 6th Legislative Yuan
Mayors of places in Taiwan
Hsinchu County Members of the Legislative Yuan
Kuomintang Members of the Legislative Yuan in Taiwan